A giant pumpkin is an orange fruit of the squash Cucurbita maxima, commonly weighing from  to over .

History 
Growing giant pumpkins emerged out of the North American agricultural tradition. The Smithsonian notes that "improbably", giant pumpkins trace themselves to Henry David Thoreau, who in 1857 grew a pumpkin weighing , which he detailed in his unfinished work Wild Fruits. The first competition giant pumpkins were grown by William Warnock of Ontario, Canada. In 1900, Warnock's  pumpkin was exhibited at the Paris World's Fair, and won a bronze medal. He beat his own record four years later, and began to provide advice to other growers on how to achieve large pumpkin yields. Warnock's record stood for some 70 years before a pumpkin growing renaissance emerged, and records were quickly shattered. Growing giant pumpkins remains a mostly North American pursuit, especially in the Northeastern United States, although several recent record holders have been European.

Giant pumpkin growing has inspired numerous related activities, including giant pumpkin boat races, and pumpkin chucking. Giant pumpkins are often exhibited at county fairs and related exhibitions.

Cultivation 
Giant pumpkins are Cucurbita maxima, a different species from the pumpkins used for jack-o'-lanterns or pumpkin pies, which are usually C. pepo. C. maxima likely emerged from wild squash in South America near Buenos Aires. Their large size was likely influenced by now extinct large gomphotheres and giant ground sloths, which were the main consumers of the fruits.

Unusually large pumpkin cultivars have been sold since at least 1834, when the 'Mammoth' variety was first offered. Little formal scientific effort has gone into finding giant pumpkins, instead increasing yields have been selected by mostly ordinary growers. Many recent pumpkins have been of the 'Dill's Atlantic Giant' cultivar selected by Howard Dill and likely descended from 'Mammoth'. Seeds of prize winning giant pumpkins are extremely valuable, with single seeds selling for up to US$850. Pedigrees similar to ones used in horse racing have been adopted for use with giant pumpkins. Despite their enormous size, they are not generally eaten, as they are not particularly tasty, and may be inedible.

Giant pumpkins may expand by up to  a day. This is made possible by several genetic adaptions. Giant pumpkin cells grow larger than regular pumpkins, and are composed of more water (up to 94%). They also lack genes that stop fruit growth, resulting in continuous expansion. Once pumpkins grow so large, they tend to no longer be round but will flatten out under their own intense weight. They will often form an arch shape on the bottom of the pumpkin for additional support as they "pancake" out. Some pumpkins may even collapse under their own weight, and transporting them is a significant challenge due to their fragility. Champion growers often grow many pumpkins, as pumpkins that crack under their own weight will be disqualified from competition.

Genetics are only part of the enormous size growers can achieve. Improved agricultural techniques, including pruning so that there is only one fruit per vine, maximizing soil tilth, and modern pest control are important factors. Some competitors set up an IV-like cannula to deliver nutrient-rich fluids directly to the stem that feeds the growing fruit. Pumpkins grown at high latitudes tend to be larger, as they have longer daylight hours and cooler, but shorter, summer seasons. However, seasons can be extended in the north by using cloches or other coverings. The time from seeding to harvest is usually 130 to 140 days, compared to 90 to 120 days for non giants. Folk wisdom in the early 20th century held that feeding milk to the pumpkins would help them grow, but this does not likely affect size. Modern growers may use professional soil laboratory analysis to ensure ideal soil nutrition. Fungal mycorrhizal and Azospirillum bacterial soil amendments have gained popularity in recent years.

World record giant pumpkins by year

Since the 1970s, pumpkin records have routinely been beaten. The rate of record growth has been increasing at a linear rate and does not appear to be slowing down, indicating that there are still substantial genetic and cultural improvements to be made in giant pumpkin growing. Structurally, calculations by David Hu of Georgia Tech indicate that a perfect pumpkin could grow up to  without breaking. Other factors, such as overly rapid hydration can still cause fruit to crack. This is caused by the volume of delivered fluids outpacing the growth rate and flexibility of the skin; much like a bursting balloon. The true upper limit regardless of structural stability and cracks is likely determined by other factors. For example, the number of sieve tube elements in the sugar-conducting phloem in a stem limit the amount of resources available to grow the fruit. There is also a consideration of the climate, diseases, pests, and growing season duration. Every year, about 10,000 growers attempt to grow champion pumpkins, and several thousand make it to official weigh-offs.

See also
 Half Moon Bay Art and Pumpkin Festival

Notes

References

Further reading

External links
Pumpkin Statistics and Pumpkin Growing Records (includes genetic information and progeny)

Squashes and pumpkins